Liechtenstein competed at the 1976 Winter Olympics in Innsbruck, Austria.  The nation won its first ever medals in Olympic competition, both in alpine skiing.

Medalists

Alpine skiing

Men

Women

Cross-country skiing

Women

Luge

Men

(Men's) Doubles

References
Official Olympic Reports
International Olympic Committee results database
 Olympic Winter Games 1976, full results by sports-reference.com

Nations at the 1976 Winter Olympics
1976
1976 in Liechtenstein